Nannopetersius ansorgii is a species of fish in the African tetra family, found in the central Rivers in Africa. The rivers in Africa are: the Benito (Mbini), the Chiloango, the Kouilou, the Loeme and the Ogooué rivers of Gabon and Equatorial Guinea and the Bengo and Congo River basins of Angola and Democratic Republic of the Congo.

Etymology
The tetra is named in honor of explorer William John Ansorge (1850-1913), who collected the type specimen.

References

Paugy, D. and S.A. Schaefer, 2007. Alestidae. p. 347-411. In M.L.J. Stiassny, G.G. Teugels and C.D. Hopkins (eds.) Poissons d'eaux douces et saumâtres de basse Guinée, ouest de l'Afrique centrale/The fresh and brackish water fishes of Lower Guinea, west-central Africa. Vol. 1. Coll. Faune et Flore tropicales 42. Istitut de recherche pour le développement, Paris, France, Muséum nationale d'histoire naturelle, Paris, France and Musée royale de l'Afrique centrale, Tervuren, Belgique. 800 p. 

Alestidae
Freshwater fish of Africa
Fish described in 1910
Taxa named by George Albert Boulenger